was a private junior college in Japan. It was located in Toyota, Aichi. It was abolished in 1999.

Departments
 Department of Japanese Culture
 Department of Human Relations

Faculty and staff
Tsukasa Morimoto, Assistant (1990-1999)

See also
Japanese Red Cross Toyota College of Nursing (1941)

References

1990 establishments in Japan
1999 disestablishments in Japan
Educational institutions established in 1990
Japanese junior colleges
Private universities and colleges in Japan
Universities and colleges in Aichi Prefecture